Kwon Chil-seung (born 18 November 1965) is a South Korean politician served as Minister of SMEs and Startups from 2021 to 2022. Kwon has represented Hwaseong City at the National Assembly from 2016 and previously at Gyeonggi Assembly from 2010 to 2016.

In January 2021, President Moon Jae-in nominated Kwon as his third Minister of SMEs and Startups as his second minister Park Young-sun announced her campaign for Seoul mayor in the upcoming bi-election.

Kwon is best known to the public for his bill which removes licenses of doctors convicted of serious crimes such as murder and sexual assault.

From 2004 to 2008 Kwon worked as an administrator at the Office of Senior Secretary for Civil Affairs to President Roh Moo-hyun working with Moon who led the Office from 2005 to 2006.

Kwon holds a bachelor's degree in economics from Korea University.

Electoral history

References 

Minjoo Party of Korea politicians
Korea University alumni
Living people
1965 births
People from Yeongcheon